Chess pie is a dessert with a filling composed mainly of flour, butter, sugar, eggs, and sometimes milk, characteristic of Southern United States cuisine.  It is similar to pecan pie without any nuts.

Jefferson Davis pie is similar to chess pie, but Jefferson Davis pie may also contain spices, nuts, or dried fruits and is usually topped with meringue.

History
Chess pie was brought from England originally and was found in New England as well as Virginia. It has some similarities to English lemon curd pie.

It is likely derived from recipes for cheeseless cheesecake that appeared in cookbooks as early as the 17th century, such as in Martha Washington's Booke of Cookery and the English A True Gentlewoman's Delight (1653). A recipe explicitly called chess pie appeared in the 1877 cookbook by Estelle Woods Wilcox, Buckeye Cookery.

Today chess pie is most commonly associated as a dessert of the American South. Common types of chess pie are buttermilk, chocolate, lemon, and nut.

Name
Several derivations of the name chess pie have been proposed. The most likely is a derivation of cheese pie, as early cookbooks grouped cheesecakes together with pies made of curd or custard. Other possible derivations include: the town of Chester, England; chest pie, from pie chest, a type of furniture used to store pies prior to home refrigeration; or an eggcorn of "It's just pie" due to a misinterpretation of the pronunciation "It's jes' pie" in Southern American English.

Composition
The basic chess pie recipe calls for the preparation of a single crust and a filling composed of flour, butter, sugar, and eggs and milk or condensed milk. Some variations call for the addition of cornmeal as a thickener.  Many recipes call for an acid such as vinegar, buttermilk, or lemon juice.

In addition to standard chess pie, other flavor variations include lemon, coconut, and chocolate chess pie.  Some nut pies, including some pecan, fall under the category of chess pies. Traditional pecan pie recipes do not include milk or condensed milk in the filling, and are typically regarded as a type of sugar pie similar to British treacle rather than a milk-containing custard (see ).

See also
 Buttermilk pie
 Chess cake
 List of pies, tarts and flans

References

Sweet pies
Cuisine of the Southern United States
American pies